A Mars flyby is a movement of spacecraft passing in the vicinity of the planet Mars, but not entering orbit or landing on it. Unmanned space probes have used this method to collect data on Mars, as opposed to orbiting or landing. A spacecraft designed for a flyby is also known as a "flyby bus" or "flyby spacecraft".

Concepts
One application of a Mars flyby is for a human mission, where after landing and staying on the surface for some time the ascent stage has a space rendezvous with another, unmanned spacecraft, that was launched separately from Earth, flying by. This  would mean the ascent stage of the lander to reach the speed necessary equal to that of the spacecraft flying by, but the resources needed for Earth return would not have to enter or leave Mars orbit.

The spacecraft they live in on the journey to Mars does the flyby, but the crew separates and goes into a lander. The Excursion module's ascent stage must rejoin the main spacecraft before it gets too far away. An advantage is that the resources needed for Earth return don't have to enter and leave Mars orbit, but the ascent stage has to perform space rendezvous in solar orbit and the time on Mars is constrained by the need to this. Mars cyclers orbit the Sun in such a way as to pass by Mars and the Earth on regular intervals, performing Mars flybys on regular intervals. The crews would live on the stations during the interplanetary voyages. The concept for Flyby Excursion Landing Module is that a lander and flyby would separate in solar orbit, the lander would accelerate to get to Mars first, then land on Mars meanwhile the other segment does a Mars flyby, then the lander takes off and rendezvous with the flyby segment transferring the crew over. (see also Mars Excursion Module (MEM))

Alternately, a flyby-only human mission is also possible, without detaching at Mars, but to slingshot around Mars and back to Earth.

History

In July 1965, Mariner 4 achieved a flyby of Mars with a return of data, providing the public and scientists with dramatically closer images of Mars. During the flyby Mariner 4 took 21 pictures amounting to about 1% of the surface of Mars. Mars was not globally mapped until the Mariner 9 orbiter, which over the course of 1972 to 1973 took thousands of images up to 100m a pixel.

In October 1999, Deep Space 1 made observations of Mars after its flyby of asteroid Braille. Although this was a very distant flyby it did succeed in taking multiple infrared spectra with its MICAS instrument of the planet.

In 2018, Mars Cube One (MarCO), two flyby CubeSats to relay communication from InSight lander during its EDL were launched towards Mars with the cruise stage. Both MarCOs reached Mars and successfully relayed data during the entry, descent, and landing phase of Insight on November 26, 2018.

List of Mars flybys

20th century
Mariner program spacecraft
Mariner 4, mapped 1% of Mars with 21 images and returned other data.
Mariner 6, and Mariner 7 returned data from Mars flybys, mapping about 20% of Mars more closely with a couple hundred images.
Mars program spacecraft
Two Mars flyby attempts were made in 1960 under Mars 1M (Mars 1960A and Mars 1960B). 
The third attempt at a Mars flyby was the Soviet Mars 2MV-4 No.1,  also called Mars 1962A or Sputnik 22, which launched in 1962 as part of the Mars program. but it was destroyed in low Earth orbit due to rocket failure. 
Mars 1 also launched in 1962 but communications failed before it reached Mars. 
Mars 4 achieved a flyby in 1974 and detected a nightside ionosphere.
Mars 6 and 7 were Mars landers carried by instrumented flyby buses.

21st century
Dawn, closest approach was 549 km.
Rosetta, within 250 km
Nozomi, flewby at about 1000 km
Mars Cube One, twin flyby relay communication CubeSats for InSight lander.
Tianwen-1 Deployable Camera,imaged Tianwen-1 in deep space

See also
List of Earth flybys
List of missions to Mars
List of planetary flybys

References

External links
Astronautix - Mars flyby
Mars by Rosetta  Annotated ESA source
Mariner 6 montage
Rosetta view of Mars during swingby by its comet lander Philae

Exploration of Mars
Spaceflight concepts
Flybys